Akihiko Ohya (大矢 明彦 Ōya Akihiko, born December 20, 1947) is a former Japanese baseball player and manager. He was the manager of the Yokohama BayStars baseball team in Japan's Nippon Professional Baseball until he was fired on May 18, 2009, for not maintaining club standards.

External links
 

1947 births
Living people
People from Ōta, Tokyo
Japanese baseball players
Komazawa University alumni
Nippon Professional Baseball catchers
Yakult Atoms players
Yakult Swallows players
Managers of baseball teams in Japan
Yokohama DeNA BayStars managers